Mom is a colloquial term for a mother, most often used in Canada, South Africa and the United States. 

Mom or Moms may also refer to:

Entertainment

Film and television
 Mom (film), a 2017 Indian thriller drama film
 Moms (film), a 2012 Russian anthology film
 Mom (TV series), an American situation comedy 
 Moms (TV series), a Philippine television talk show
 Mom (Futurama), a character in the TV series Futurama
 Mom, a fictional character in the film Holes
 Mom, a fish on the American television talk show FishCenter Live
 Mom (Dexter's Laboratory), a fictional character from the animated series Dexter's Laboratory
 "The Moms", an episode of 30 Rock
 M.O.M.s: Mhies on a Mission, a Philippine talk show

Music
 Moms (album), a 2012 album by Menomena
 "Mom" (Bonnie Tyler song), 2013; covered by Garth Brooks, 2014
 "Mom" (Earth, Wind & Fire song), 1972
 "Mom" (Meghan Trainor song), 2016

Other entertainment
 "Mom" (short story), a Thai short story by Kukrit Pramoj

People

Nickname or stage name
 Mom Boucher (1953-2022), Canadian convicted murderer and Hells Angels member
 Moms Mabley (1894–1975), African American comedian

Surname
 Arturo S. Mom (1893–?), Argentine screenwriter and film director
 Mom Chim Huy (born 1939), Cambodian politician
 Mark Mom (born 1974), Papua New Guinean rugby league footballer
 Rady Mom (born 1970), Cambodian-born American politician
 Mom Soth, Cambodian film actor

MOM or MOMS
 Mars Orbiter Mission, an Indian spacecraft
 Music for Our Mother Ocean, a series of 1990s alternative-rock charity albums
 City Municipality of Maribor
 Management Object Model, in high-level architecture parlance
 Manufacturing operations management, a methodology for optimization of manufacturing operations
 Medicaid Obstetrical and Maternal Services, a program in New York State Department of Health
 Member of the Order of Merit of the Police Forces, a Canadian award
 Memory of Mankind
 Message-oriented middleware, a category of communications software
 Methoxymethane, an ether
 Microsoft Operations Manager, a network management product
 Ministry of General Machine Building, a Russian agency that oversaw the development of spacecraft 
 Modular Ocean Model, a numerical model for studying the global ocean climate system
 MOM Brands, formerly Malt-O-Meal, American breakfast cereal company
 Monmouth Ocean Middlesex Line, a proposed New Jersey Transit rail line
 Mothers Organized for Moral Stability, a 1960s socially conservative American organization
 Methoxymethyl, see also chloromethyl methyl ether
 Maison de l'Orient et de la Méditerranée, a research body in France, specializing in the ancient Mediterranean and Middle East
 Member of the National Order of Merit (Republic of Malta)

MoM
 Mall of Memphis, a defunct mall in Memphis, Tennessee
 Master of Magic, a 1994 fantasy turn-based strategy computer game
 Methods of Mayhem, an American rapcore band
 Method of moments (disambiguation)
 Milk of magnesia a suspension of magnesium hydroxide in water
 Minions of Mirth, an MMORPG by Prairie Games
 Ministry of Manpower (Singapore), a governmental organization in Singapore as well as other countries
 Ministry of Magic, the Government for the Magical community of Britain and Ireland in the series Harry Potter written by J. K. Rowling
 Ministry of Mayhem, a British children's television show
 Minutes of meeting, instant written record of a meeting or hearing
 Mouse on Mars, an electronic music duo from Germany
 Multiple of the median
 The Lord of the Rings Online: Mines of Moria, an expansion for the computer game The Lord of the Rings Online: Shadows of Angmar
 Doctor Strange in the Multiverse of Madness, a 2022 superhero film

Other uses
 Mom (royal title), a Thai royal title
 mom, the abbreviation for the obsolete unit of length myriometre

See also

Mister Mom (disambiguation)
Mommy (disambiguation)
Mum (disambiguation)
Mummy (disambiguation)
Mother (disambiguation)
Mama (disambiguation)
Ma (disambiguation)